Jason M. Schultz (born November 27, 1972) is the Iowa State Senator from the 6th District - previously Iowa's 9th District (2015-2022).  A Republican, he served in the Iowa House of Representatives from 2009 to 2015 and is an advocate for the loosening of child labor laws. He lives in Schleswig, Crawford County.

Schultz worked as an insurance adjuster at Farmers Mutual Insurance Association in Schleswig and has farmed near Schleswig with his father DeWayne Schultz. For 13 years Schultz served as a volunteer firefighter, and served seven years in the Iowa National Guard. He is a retiring member of the Horn Memorial Hospital Foundation in the fall of 2007. In 2011 he endorsed Republican presidential candidate Ron Paul. In 2015 he endorsed Presidential Candidate Ted Cruz.

, Schultz serves on several committees in the Iowa House – the Economic Growth, Environmental Protection, and Labor committees.  He also serves as the chair of the Local Government committee and as a member of the Administration and Regulation Appropriations Subcommittee.

As of January 2017, Schultz serves as the chair of the Labor and Business Relations committee, and a member of the Judiciary, State Government, and Ways and Means committees.

Electoral history
*incumbent

References

External links

 Representative Jason Schultz official Iowa General Assembly site
 
 Financial information (state office) at the National Institute for Money in State Politics
 Profile at Iowa House Republicans

1972 births
Living people
Republican Party members of the Iowa House of Representatives
Republican Party Iowa state senators
People from Crawford County, Iowa
Insurance agents
Place of birth missing (living people)
21st-century American politicians